Cirkeline (Eng: Circleen) is a Danish comic book character, created by Hanne Hastrup in 1957. The character is a little elf with spiky black hair, who wears a red dress with black dots and prefers walking barefoot.

Between 1968 and 1971, the comic was adapted for a series of animated shorts, when Hanne Hastrup wrote the scripts and Jannik Hastrup animated and produced 18 short films for the Danish public TV station Danmarks Radio. The last of the short films, Flugten Fra Amerika (Escape from America) has an anti-American message that prevented it from being broadcast. No new Cirkeline films were released until 1998.

The first Cirkeline book was published in 1969, and in 1998, she took the leap to the big cinema screen in the first of 3 feature films. Cirkeline became a brand, which has grown stronger and stronger ever since and today there are 9 books, music CDs and a range of products from underwear to cups and plates.

Several of the film's songs, written by Hans-Henrik Ley, have become classics - e.g. "Bim, Bam, Busse" ("Mile, Male, Mole"), "Snemusen Knud" ("Knut the Snowmouse") and "Cirkeline har fødselsdag" ("Circleen's birthday").

The little elf has been loved by children for generations, even having her own app and a crowd of friends on Facebook.

Films
Cirkeline appears in the following animated feature-length films:
 Circleen: City Mouse, Cirkeline: Storbyens mus (1998, Denmark)
 Circleen: Mice and Romance, Cirkeline 2: Ost og Kærlighed (2000, Denmark)
 Circleen and World's smallest superhero, Cirkeline og Verdens mindste superhelt (2004, Denmark)

Stamps
In 2002, Post Danmark (the Danish postal service) made four postage stamp featuring Danish comic book characters. The stamps featured Cirkeline, Valhalla, Rasmus Klump, and Jungledyret Hugo.

References

Danish comic strips
Comics characters introduced in 1957
1957 comics debuts
Fictional elves
Fantasy comics
Fictional Danish people
Comics adapted into animated series
Comics adapted into television series
Comics adapted into animated films